Africalpe is a genus of moths in the family Erebidae.

Species
 Africalpe intrusa Krüger, 1939
 Africalpe nubifera Hampson, 1907
 Africalpe vagabunda Swinhoe, 1884

References
Natural History Museum Lepidoptera genus database

Calpinae
Noctuoidea genera